The NCHA Super Stakes is the second jewel in the National Cutting Horse Association's annual Triple Crown.  It is held in April following the November/December NCHA World Championship Futurity and a few months before the NCHA Derby, which is held during the summer in conjunction with the NCHA Summer Spectacular.  The Super Stakes is an event for 4-year-old horses while the Super Stakes Classic is for 5- and 6-year-old horses.  The event is limited to the offspring of stallions that were previously nominated by paying a subscription fee, the majority of which is added back to the million purse offered in prize money.

References

External links
 National Cutting Horse Association (U.S.)

National Cutting Horse Association